Aliabad (also Romanized as ‘Alīābād) is a village in Shal Rural District, Shahrud District, Khalkhal County, Ardabil Province, Iran. At the 2006 census, its population was 35, in 10 families.

References 

Towns and villages in Khalkhal County